Charles Delporte (11 March 1893 – 9 October 1960) was a Belgian fencer and Olympic champion in épée competition.

He won a gold medal in épée individual at the 1924 Summer Olympics in Paris, and a silver medal with the Belgian team.

References

External links

1893 births
1960 deaths
Belgian male fencers
Olympic fencers of Belgium
Fencers at the 1920 Summer Olympics
Fencers at the 1924 Summer Olympics
Fencers at the 1928 Summer Olympics
Olympic gold medalists for Belgium
Olympic silver medalists for Belgium
Olympic medalists in fencing
Year of death unknown
Medalists at the 1924 Summer Olympics
20th-century Belgian people